Apollo's Chariot is a steel roller coaster at the Busch Gardens Williamsburg amusement park in James City County, Virginia, United States. The ride was the first Hyper Coaster designed by Swiss firm Bolliger & Mabillard. It officially opened to the public on March 27, 1999.

Riders ascend  on the chain lift hill before dropping  at an angle of 65°. Apollo's Chariot has been well received, consistently ranking in the top 10 of the annual Golden Ticket Awards from Amusement Today.

History
Apollo's Chariot was announced on September 5, 1998, as the tallest and fastest roller coaster at Busch Gardens Williamsburg. An article in the Daily Press on January 23, 1999, mentioned that the ride was nearing completion with approximately 20 pieces of track left to be installed. Apollo's Chariot performed its first test runs in mid-February 1999.

The ride opened on March 27, 1999. Upon opening, it was the first hypercoaster from Swiss manufacturer Bolliger & Mabillard. Busch Gardens held Apollo's Chariot's opening ceremony three days later on March 30. Italian fashion model Fabio Lanzoni was brought in to promote the new roller coaster; this was part of Busch Gardens Williamsburg's annual program of celebrity appearances. During the ride's inaugural run, a 10-pound goose struck him in the face leaving his nose covered with blood. He was treated at a nearby hospital for minor cuts, while the goose was killed on impact.

Characteristics
The  Apollo's Chariot is a Hyper Coaster made by Bolliger & Mabillard. The park's existing terrain is utilized to allow a  lift hill to be translated into a first drop stretching . Riders of Apollo's Chariot experience up to 4.1 times the force of gravity on the 2-minute, 15-second ride. Apollo's Chariot operates with three trains with nine cars per train. Riders are arranged four across in a single row for a total of 36 riders per train. This configuration of trains allows for a theoretical capacity of 1,750 riders per hour. Riders are restrained by a lap bar and the seats are elevated so riders’ feet don't touch the ground.

Ride experience

After departing from the station, the train begins to climb the  chain lift hill. When the train reaches the top, it drops down a few feet in a pre-drop. The pre-drop serves to reduce the stress and pull of the chain. At the end of the ravine, the train enters a second airtime hill with a  drop. A short narrow above ground tunnel is at the bottom of the second drop. After the tunnel, the train descends a  drop, which banks to the left as it descends. The train then goes through an upward helix. Coming out of the helix, the train drops  then turns right and rises up into the mid-course brake run. The train drops  out of the brake run followed by another drop at  toward the ravine. The train then banks right, makes a  dip, turns left and goes through a small  dip. The train then makes one last  airtime drop before climbing up and into the final brake run. There is approximately 26 seconds of airtime during the 2-minute, 15-second ride.

Incidents 
On July 15, 2018, a family from Virginia Beach, Virginia, suffered injuries as they were riding the roller coaster due to a ride operator accidentally pressing the emergency stop button, causing them to report concussions the next day. In July 2019, a guest from Virginia Beach sued Busch Gardens Williamsburg's parent company SeaWorld Parks & Entertainment. The guest claimed that he had suffered severe injuries on Apollo's Chariot due to the previous year's emergency-stop incident.

Reception
When Apollo's Chariot opened, the Daily Press described it as setting "a new standard in stomach-churning fun", enhanced by the fact that the ride had 26 seconds of airtime. In the ride's debut year, Busch Gardens Williamsburg had lower than expected levels of attendance. This was attributed to prolonged periods of inclement weather. As a result of this, the park planned to relaunch Apollo's Chariot in 2000 in an attempt to drive attendance.

In Amusement Todays annual Golden Ticket Awards, Apollo's Chariot has consistently ranked highly. In its debut year, it ranked position 20. In the 13 years since, the coaster has consistently ranked higher, peaking at #4 in 2005, 2007, 2008 and 2012.

References

External links

 
 

Busch Gardens Williamsburg
Steel roller coasters
Roller coasters in Virginia
Roller coasters introduced in 1999
Roller coasters manufactured by Bolliger & Mabillard
Roller coasters operated by SeaWorld Parks & Entertainment
Hypercoasters manufactured by Bolliger & Mabillard